El Pantano is a corregimiento in Santa Fé District, Veraguas Province, Panama with a population of 658 as of 2010. Its population as of 1990 was 725; its population as of 2000 was 676.

References

Corregimientos of Veraguas Province